Mordellistena amica is a species of beetle in the genus Mordellistena of the family Mordellidae. It was discovered in 1862.

References

amica